Stephen Hodge (born 18 July 1961) is an Australian former cyclist.  He was a professional between 1987 and 1996. Hodge rode 14 Grand Tours in his career managing to finish every one  he started.

Biography
After retirement, he became Vice President of Cycling Australia. Hodge was a founding member and a board member of the Amy Gillett Foundation. Hodge is now a cycling ambassador and works for We Ride Australia, a campaign to increase cycling and reduce carbon output.

Doping
In 2012, in wake of the Lance Armstrong doping allegations he admitted that he doped during his professional career, and stepped down from his position with Cycling Australia.

Major results

1985
 3rd Overall GP Tell
 6th Grand Prix des Nations
1986
 2nd GP Lugano
1987
 2nd GP Villafranca de Ordizia
 2nd Clásica de Sabiñánigo
1988
 1st Grand Prix Impanis-Van Petegem
 9th Overall Tour du Limousin
1989
 2nd Overall Herald Sun Tour
1st Stage 11
 4th Overall Étoile de Bessèges
 7th Grand Prix de la Libération (TTT)
1990
 1st Clásica a los Puertos
 5th Overall Tour de Romandie
1991
 3rd Overall Giro del Trentino
 4th Overall Tour de Romandie
1st Stage 3
 4th Overall Étoile de Bessèges
 6th Overall Volta a Catalunya
 6th Milano–Torino
 7th Subida a Urkiola
 8th Road race, UCI Road World Championships
 8th Grand Prix des Nations
 9th Tour du Nord-Ouest
1992
 1st Stage 1 Critérium International
 3rd Giro dell'Emilia
 10th Giro di Lombardia
1993
 2nd Grand Prix des Nations
1994
 1st Stage 13 Herald Sun Tour
 9th Grand Prix des Nations
1995
 8th Overall Volta a Catalunya
1996
 1st Stage 5b Troféu Joaquim Agostinho
 2nd Overall Herald Sun Tour
1st Stages 7 & 10a
 9th Overall Tour Méditerranéen

Grand Tour general classification results timeline

References

External links

Doping cases in Australian cycling
1961 births
Living people
Australian male cyclists
Olympic cyclists of Australia
Cyclists at the 1996 Summer Olympics
Place of birth missing (living people)